Mantoides is a monotypic butterfly genus in the family Lycaenidae erected by Hamilton Herbert Druce in 1896. Its only species, Mantoides gama, the Distant's Imperial, was first described by William Lucas Distant in 1886. It is found in the Indomalayan realm.

References

Iolaini
Lycaenidae genera
Taxa named by Hamilton Herbert Druce
Monotypic butterfly genera